Guangdong Nanhua Vocational College of Industry and Commerce is a public vocational college in Guangdong, China.

The college has three campuses (Tianhe Campus, Huangpu Campus and Qingyuan Campus), a combined student body of 20,000 students, 406 faculty members, and over 200,000 living alumni. The university consists of four schools and four departments, with 28 specialties for undergraduates. The university has 44 research institutions and research centres and 50 extracurricular practice bases.

History
Guangdong Nanhua Vocational College of Industry and Commerence was officially founded in 1993.

Schools and departments
 School of Foreign Languages and Trade
 School of Finance and Finance
 School of Information Engineering and Business Management
 School of Architecture and Art Design
 Department of Ideological and Political
 Department of Sports and Art
 Department of Tourism Management
 Department of Law and Public Service

Campuses

Tianhe Campus
The Tianhe Campus is at the foot of Baiyun Mountain in Tianhe District of Guangzhou.

Huangpu Campus
The Huangpu Campus is on Changzhou Island, Huangpu District of Guangzhou. It is a part of Guangzhou Higher Education Mega Center.

Qingyuan Campus

Culture
"" is the motto of the college, meaning realistic, diligent, studious, healthy, harmonious and elegant self respect in English.

Library
There are 0.9257 million items in the library, including 0.6638 million copies of paper documents (books, newspapers and periodicals), 0.2421 million electronic books, 19 thousand and 800 CD-ROMs, and 393 periodicals and 82 newspapers.

Gallery

References

External links
 

Universities and colleges in Guangdong
Educational institutions established in 1993
Education in Guangzhou
Education in Qingyuan
1993 establishments in China